Lucky Boy is a 2017 comedy and coming-of-age film directed by Boris Boo, and starring Wang Weiliang, Venus Wong, Chew Chor Meng and Chen Xiuhuan as the main cast.

Plot
Lin Yu (Wang Weiliang) is a boy who is constantly surrounded by misfortune and is always one step behind others. Since primary school, he has a crush on Zhang Qingqing (Venus Wong), and continues to pin for her throughout his life. Will Lin Yu, the destined "unlucky" boy, be able to change his fate?

Cast
 Wang Weiliang as Lin Yu
 Venus Wong as Zhang Qingqing, Lin Yu's love interest
 Chew Chor Meng as Lin Chong, Lin Yu's father
 Chen Xiuhuan as Wu Zhi, Lin Yu's mother
 Jeremy Chan as Da Jie, Lin Yu's friend
 Melody Low as Yu Mei, Qingqing's friend
 Terence Then as Ray, Lin Yu's friend
 Roz Pho as Mei Ling, Lin Yu's sister
 Priscilla Lim as Wan Wen, Mei Ling's friend
 Danny Yeo
Kwan Seck Mui
 Darryl Yong
 Gurmit Singh
 Henry Thia
 Jack Neo as the school principal
 Maxi Lim
 Suhaimi Yusof
 Tay Yin Yin
 Zhu Houren

Production

Pre-production
According to an interview, Boris Boo said that Lim Teck of Clover Films "approached (him) to make a film about an unlucky person", and that he is "always very fascinated with the state of mind of human being", in the sense that a person "will blame any failure on luck" when he thinks he is unlucky, and if "something happened on this guy, and makes him think that there is a change in his luck, then out of a sudden, he will think he has the world under his feet", and "not only he becomes confident, but also takes failures on his stride and will brush them off easily".

Casting and crew
On July 15, 2015, during a press conference, it was announced that the film would be directed by Boris Boo, and that Chew Chor Meng and Wang Weiliang would be starring in the film. Chew was cast as Wang's father, due to his previous work experience with Boo on the set of Don't Worry Be Happy, and for his role as Ah Bee in Don't Worry Be Happy and its spin-off, Lobang King. Wang, who is best known for his role as Lobang in the Ah Boys to Men franchise, would be taking up the lead role for the first time. Meanwhile, auditions were held for fresh female talents to play Wang's love interest.

In October, it was announced that Venus Wong and Chen Xiuhuan have joined the cast, with Wong playing Wang's love interest, and Chen playing Chew's wife. Chew and Chen had previously starred together in dramas such as The Witty Advisor and Heavenly Beings. The film was slated to be released on the second quarter of 2016, but has been postponed to May 2017.

Filming
Filming started on October 5, 2015, and lasted for 25 days. Most of the scenes were shot in Singapore, with some done in Malaysia.

Reception

Critical reception
Boon Chan of The Straits Times rated the film a 2 out of 5 stars, commenting that the "will-they-or-won't-they premise (of Lin Yu's pursuit for Qing Qing) drags out for far too long". Meanwhile, there could be a "much-needed trim, especially the jarring jump from light-hearted comedy romance to melodrama", and "the attempt to add some heft by incorporating real-life events from the Hotel New World collapse in 1986 to the Sars outbreak in 2003 does not really work".

Box office
As of June 21, 2017, the film collected $450,000 in the box office.

References

External links
 
 

2017 films
2010s English-language films
Singaporean comedy films
Films shot in Singapore
Films set in Singapore
2010s Mandarin-language films